Kalanchoe top-spotting virus (KTSV) is a plant pathogenic virus of the family Caulimoviridae.

External links
ICTVdB - The Universal Virus Database: Kalanchoë top-spotting badnavirus
Family Groups - The Baltimore Method

Caulimoviridae
Viral plant pathogens and diseases